Vilar is a Portuguese, Galician and Catalan surname. Notable people with the surname include:

Alberto Vilar ( Albert Vilar; born 1940), American investment banker
António Vilar (1912–1995), Portuguese-born Spanish actor
Audric del Vilar (12th-cent.), French Provençal lord and troubadour
Carlos Alcántara Vilar (born 1964), Peruvian stand-up comedian and actor
Carlos Vilar (1930–2021), Argentine Snipe sailor; brother of Jorge Vilar
Eduíno Vilar [see: Communist Party of Portugal (Marxist–Leninist)] (1970–1974), Portuguese communist publisher and politician
Esther Vilar (born 1935), Argentine author, playwright, and physician
Federico Vilar (born 1977), Argentine and Mexican footballer
Fernando Vilar (born 1954), Portuguese-born Uruguayan journalist and news anchor
Irene Vilar (born 1969), Puerto Rican American editor, literary agent, author, memoirist, and environmental advocate
Jean Vilar (1912–1971), French actor, theater director, and scenic designer
Joan Vilar i Costa (1889–1962), Spanish Jesuit priest, librarian, and exile
Jorge Vilar (1931–2014), Argentine snipe sailor; brother of sailer Carlos Vilar
José de Nouvilas de Vilar (1843–1913), Spanish Puerto Rican soldier and politician
José Miguel Vilar-Bou (born 1979), Spanish science-fiction and horror writer, and journalist
Marcelo Vilar (born 1961), Brazilian football manager
Pierre Vilar (1906–2003), French historian and writer
Raf Vilar ( Rafael Vilar; born ?), Brazilian-born British singer-songwriter
Ricardo Vilar (born 1985), Brazilian footballer
Roberto Vilar (born 1971), Spanish comedian, television presenter, and actor
Roberto Vilar (footballer) (born 1976), Portuguese footballer
Tesa Vilar (born 1995), Slovenian racing cyclist
Tracy Vilar (born 1968), American actor, casting director, and producer
Vicente Vilar David (1889–1937), Spanish Catholic martyr, venerated Christian, and engineer

Portuguese-language surnames
Spanish-language surnames
Galician-language surnames
Catalan-language surnames